Ronald Thomas Burbeck (born 27 February 1934) is an English former footballer who scored 25 goals from 160 appearances in the Football League playing as a winger for Leicester City, Middlesbrough and Darlington. He went on to play in the Southern League for Hereford United.

Football career
Burbeck was born in Leicester, and began his football career with his hometown club, Leicester City. In July 1951, he was one of 20 youngsters selected by the Football Association for an England Youth training camp, and in October that same year, the 17-year-old Burbeck was selected to represent the North in an amateur international trial. He played for England Youth against their Scottish and Welsh counterparts in 1952, and was a member of the squad for that year's FIFA Under-18 Tournament.

He made his Leicester debut in the Football League on 15 September 1952 in the Second Division match away to West Ham United, and played twice more, in the 1955–56 season, before moving on to fellow Second Division club Middlesbrough in 1956. He made his debut in a 3–1 win against Port Vale on 6 October, and in his sixth match, against Nottingham Forest, created the second goal of Brian Clough's first senior hat-trick. Burbeck remained in the starting eleven for 54 consecutive matches in all competitions, making way in December 1957 for the debut of future England international Eddie Holliday. He regained his place, only to lose it again after breaking his wrist in January 1959. He returned to the team towards the end of the season, and on 22 October 1960 scored twice in a 6–6 draw at Charlton Athletic; it was only the second time that such a scoreline had occurred in the Football League. He finished his Middlesbrough career in 1963, with 24 goals from 139 League matches and another 5 goals from 13 cup ties.

His league career ended with 18 appearances and a goal in the 1963–64 Third Division season with Darlington, and then spent time with Southern League club Hereford United.

Cricket
Burbeck played twice for Leicestershire II in the Minor Counties Cricket Championship in 1958.

References

1934 births
Living people
Footballers from Leicester
English footballers
Association football wingers
Leicester City F.C. players
Middlesbrough F.C. players
Darlington F.C. players
Hereford United F.C. players
English Football League players
Southern Football League players
English cricketers